Lauderdale Maitland (1878 – 28 February 1929) was a British stage and film actor.

Selected filmography
 Ivanhoe (1913)
 The Beggar Girl's Wedding (1915)
 Queen's Evidence (1919)
 The Right to Strike (1923)
 The Taming of the Shrew (1923)
 A Woman in Pawn (1927)

References

External links

Lauderdale Maitland on Great War Theatre

1879 births
1929 deaths
British male film actors
British male stage actors
Male actors from London
20th-century British male actors